Lake of the Woods is a lake located by Chapel Corners, New York. The outlet flows into the Indian River. Fish species present in the lake are northern pike, lake trout, black crappie, smallmouth bass, rainbow trout, landlocked salmon, whitefish, yellow perch, rock bass, and bluegill. There is a state-owned beach launch on the lake off Cottage Hill Road and there is a 10 horsepower limit.

References 

Lakes of Jefferson County, New York